Finan may refer to:

 Finan Cam, Abbot of Kinnity, an early Irish saint.
 Finan of Lindisfarne (died 661), second Bishop of Lindisfarne from 651 until 661.

See also

Finan (surname)
Finnan (disambiguation)
Finnian (disambiguation)